Luana Tanaka Ostan  (born October 11, 1989) is a Brazilian actress.

Biography 
Luana Tanaka was born in São Paulo, Brazil. She is of Japanese, French and Belgian descent.

She gained fame after playing the part of the dekasegi Keiko, in the television series Morde & Assopra. In 2013, she participated in the series Sessão de Terapia, giving life to Lia. In 2014, she played Elda, expert and best friend of Vera Luana Piovani, in TV show Dupla Identidade created by Glória Perez.

In 2016, she was cast as Ágata in the Netflix original series 3%.

Filmography

Television

Cinema

Theater

Clip

Streaming

References

External links 
 

1993 births
Living people
Actresses from São Paulo
Brazilian people of Japanese descent
Brazilian people of Belgian descent
Brazilian people of French descent
Brazilian television actresses
Brazilian film actresses
Brazilian telenovela actresses
Brazilian stage actresses